Horst Dietrich Preuß (1 May 1927 – 25 December 1993 in Neuendettelsau) was a German Protestant theologian, Lutheran pastor, and professor of Old Testament at the University of Göttingen and from 1973 to 1992 at Augustana Divinity School in Neuendettelsau.

Education 
Preuss earned his habilitation on 29 October 1969 at the Faculty of Theology of the University of Göttingen.

Life and work 
Preuß was first a pastor in Laatzen and from 1963 to 1971 a lecturer in Old Testament at the Celle Theological Academy (formerly: Pfarrvikarseminar) of the Evangelical Lutheran Church of Hanover.

Later he was an Old Testament lecturer at the University of Göttingen. From there he moved to the Augustana University in Neuendettelsau in 1973. From 1973 to 1992 Professor of Old Testament at the Augustana-Hochschule Neuendettelsau.

Selected publications 
 
 
 
 
 
 
 
 
 
 
 
 Teología del Antiguo Testamento, Bilbao.
 Old Testament theology, Edinburgh und Louisville, Ky.

References

Literature 

1927 births
1993 deaths
Old Testament scholars
Academic staff of the University of Göttingen